Petra Maria Thorén (born 8 August 1969) is a former tennis player from Finland.

Thorén won five singles titles and one doubles title on the ITF Women's Circuit. On 23 March 1992, she reached her best singles ranking of world No. 73. On 25 April 1994, she peaked at No. 112 in the WTA doubles rankings.

Playing for Finland Fed Cup team, Thorén has a win–loss record of 18–17 in Fed Cup competition.

ITF finals

Singles (5–4)

Doubles (1–4)

References

External links
 
 

Living people
1969 births
Finnish female tennis players
Place of birth missing (living people)
20th-century Finnish women
21st-century Finnish women